Shimon Ben Aharon Agassi (also spelled Simon Aghassi) was a Hakham and Kabbalist in Baghdad. He was known as HARASHBA, an acronym for Harav Rabbi Shimon Ben Aharon.

Personal life 

Hakham Agassi was born in 1852. He was married to Rachel Abdallah Eliya Bahar (1866–1954). Together they had ten children:

 Aharon Agassi (1882–1898)
 Menashe Agassi (1884–1889)
 Farha Agassi Somek (1888–1992)
 Meir Sassoon Hai Agassi (1891–1896)
 Esther Agassi Somekh (1892–1988)
 Ezra Zion Agassi (1897–1992)
 Dina Agassi Shaashua (1898–1980)
 Khatoun Agassi Judah (1903–1988)
 Mazal Tov Agassi (1905–1990)
 Eliyahu Haim Agassi (1909–1991)

Hakham Agassi died on the eve of Tisha B'Av, 1914.

Hakham Yehuda Fatiyah was one of his disciples.

Works 

Hakham Agassi authored: Imrey Shimon; B'ney Aharon (a commentary on Sha'ar HaGilgulim by Rabbi Hayyim Vital); D'rasha; Fundamentals of Torah (on the Thirteen Principles of Faith); Z'hav Sh'va; and Shem MiShim'on.

External links 
Family tree of Hakham Rabbi Shimon Ben Aharon Agassi
Selected essays written by Hakham Rabbi Shimon Agassi

References 

1852 births
1914 deaths
Authors of Kabbalistic works
Hebrew-language writers
Rabbis from Baghdad
Orthodox rabbis
Writers from Baghdad
Place of birth missing
Place of death missing